Ferizaj, the fifth largest city in Kosovo, has been populated since the pre-historic era. The history of Ferizaj is significant due to its impact on the economic, political, social culture of the region from antiquity to the present.

Early history
The oldest ethno-cultural group who lived in the 6th and 5th millennia BC in the territory of Kosovo was the Starčevo culture. Members of this group constructed their homes near rivers and the river terraces. They made their homes of willows and mud, while their main profession was plowing and farming.

Another ethno-cultural group, which took the place of Starčevo culture, is the Vinča culture. These population shifts occurred around 4300 BC. The newcomers also built their settlements near rivers. Such settlements were unfortified, with dense rows of willows and mud houses. Remnants of their material culture, mostly different forms of ceramic vessels and the large numbers of baked clay figures, testify on higher cultural level. The Bubanj-Hum culture, an eneolithic culture, followed. This cultural group expanded from the east, from the territory of today's Bulgaria. When carriers of this ethno-cultural group reached the region before the end of the 6th millennium BC, they destroyed Vinča settlements. Remnants of their material culture have not survived.

After Bubanj-Hum, the Baden culture arrived from the Danube, representing its southernmost influence in Kosovo. Baden culture ended before the end of the 3rd millennium BC.

In passing from the 2nd to 1st millennium BC in the period of the late Bronze Age, we find a unique way of burial, present in a large part of Central and Southern Europe, in the framework of which was also seen in Kosovo. The ashes of the dead were burned and placed with different items in a large clay pot, and then buried in the ground. Such an urn was accidentally discovered in Varosh.

From the mid-8th century BC to the Roman conquest of the region, a new culture developed, belonging to the Dardani. The Dardani burned the dead and buried their remnants in tumuli tombs. In Ferizaj, two such necropolises have been found, one in the locality of Kuline, near Gërlicë, and the other in Mollopolc, along the Ferizaj-Shtime road.

Around 280 BC, Dardania is recorded as a political community ruled by a king.

Most of the information on the Dardani are about their wars against Macedonia. The first contact between the Dardani and the Romans was in 200 BC, when they offered military assistance in a fight against Macedonia. In 96 BC, Roman Emperor Sulla subdued the Dardani. Numerous Roman settlements were established across the valley, notably on the old lake terraces. These settlements also accompanied a road network, connecting cities such as Ulpiana and Skopje, which were part of the route connecting Macedonia to Dalmatia, passing through Ferizaj and the gorge of Kaçanik. Parts of the route have been discovered on the river bed of the Lepenac, near the village of Doganaj, and near the village of Reka.

Middle Ages
Ferizaj's close suburb at the time of the Middle Ages was of great importance. Thence passing was one of the most important routes of the Middle Ages, starting from the north, from Slovenia and Croatia through Sarajevo, to Vučitrn, Pristina and Lipljan, then passing through Ferizaj and ending at Skopje in the south. With this main northern line, traffic affected the Shkodër-Prizren road.

In the library of St Mark's Basilica, Venice, a manuscript was found, describing an anonymous traveler in 1559/60; "Costatinopoli viaggio da Venezia". During the continental trip from Venice to Istanbul, noted was as follows: "On July 3 I set off and came to a place named Villa Negra (from Italy to Carralevë)... The valley is surrounded on all sides by hills." He further writes that he reached Sopotnice, near modern-day Ferizaj, with the same name that is located near Kaçanik. He then writes that he continued on the path and arrived in Skopje on July 5.

Jakov Saranco, Venetian deputy of the royal palace of Sultan Murad III (1575), while traveling to Istanbul route via the Shkodër-Prizren road arrived in the Zascodi village, which is located in an area between fertile and forested hills. As such, it is inferred that it referred to Zaskok, which is near Nerodimë.

In the district is a locality which, according to its modern name, Varosh, resembles a structure of a typical Byzantine settlement - more developed than a village, but again not a city.

Kosovo became the center of regional activity, with cities such as the previously mentioned Nerodimë, Štimlje, and others, with Prizren and Pristina retaining their status as political, economic and cultural hubs.

Under the Ottoman Empire
In the 1455 census conducted by the Turkish authorities in the province of Brankovic most villages belonging to the municipality of Ferizaj, then belonging to the province of Morava, 646 villages of this province villages of Ferizaj were larger than others. According to sources about 90% of the population were of Slavic origin, 10% Albanians, Vlachs, Greeks, and Bulgarians.

Agriculture was the basic source of income in these villages, including other associated activities like crafts rural economy where distinguish: blacksmiths, potter, masters of lime, furrier, ranchers, and priests and monks.

After the Austrian-Turkish wars of the late 17th century and the first half of the 18th century, major ethnic changes occur and begins the rapid Islamization from Ottoman Empire. Until the construction of the railway Skopje-Mitrovica, according to Turkish sources we do not find residence called Feriz-Bey (Ferizaj). At the beginning it was called "Tasjon" by surrounding villagers by the Turkish pronunciation of French word "Station", but the name Ferizaj is obtained by Mr. Feriz Shasivari.

Ferizaj's rapid development starts with construction of the railway station and within a short period become the city with inns, warehouses, and permanent market. Traffic, traders of Kosovo Prizren -Shkodër which at that time was by caravan, was mainly diverted toward Thessaloniki. Exporting raw materials especially that of cereals went through Ferizaj and through aligned foreign goods turnover came from Thessaloniki and Skopje. This was the reason that Ferizaj for a period of thirty years become the city with about 400 houses and 200 shops. Most of the population work in trade, crafts and other activities related to trade. During this period, the opening of the colonial shops, craft workshops so accelerated development of the city enough that some passengers of the 20th century describing how the city at that time resembled and at that time the city had more stores than houses.

Ferizaj regarded as a center of important historic events that brought revolution of Young Turks and removing the dispensation of Abdul Hamid II. As in other countries and in Kosovo and Ferizaj, are formed committees of Young Turks, majority led by Albanian officer. Even in the coming years Ferizaj continues to be the center of events. In July 1908 in Ferizaj Albanians demonstrate against big powers initially against Austria, Young Turks use this opportunity to direct demonstration against Sultan sending a telegram on behalf the Kosovo leaders calling for the restoration of the constitutional order the Sultan dispensation of Abdul Hamid II this also shows the arrival in power of Young Turks. That same year began fighting between the Albanian insurgents and the Turkish army.

While during 1909 in all cities of Kosovo including Ferizaj, the Albanian secret committees formed for preparation of the uprising.

In 1912 Albanian the insurgent forces, in general Balkans uprising took over leadership Pristina and other cities including Ferizaj.

In Ferizaj focus bulk of Albanian forces led by Idriz Seferi, Isa Boletini and in order to put pressure on Skopje and when negotiations did not result positive Albanian forces on August 12 from Pristina and Ferizaj took over the leadership of Skopje through which reached the culmination of the Albanian uprising causing the decline of government forces in Ottoman Empire and came to send a delegation to negotiate with the other leaders of the uprising.

Besides the rapid economic development and urban development in Ferizaj education and schools were not developed. The oldest school was Nerodime school.

As in other cities in Ferizaj funds established church, after Young Turks revolution 1910–1912 period here established society of Kestrels. From the years 1913–1915 all schools of Kosovo involved in the Serbian school system.

The founding of the city
The founding of the city of Ferizaj came as a result of the construction of the railway line Mitrovica-Skopje that was completed in 1973. Construction of this railway was financed by Turkey, while the design and execution of works were made from the French, for that reason until recently the railway was called by the residents of Ferizaj "Udha e Frengut" (The French Way).

In the same year the city has received the denomination that is today, so Ferizaj. City designation is based on the first caravanserai in the township Feriz Shasivari, in which has been operating for several decades and served mainly for accommodation of merchants. The exact location of this han that played a role in the naming of the city is not known precisely.

Ferizaj is a rare case how a city was established on the basis of the construction of the railways. The development of the city had been on both sides of the railway, and the railway has played and plays a vital role in the lives of the citizens of Ferizaj.

Balkan War and the establishment of the Serbian kingdom
After forming of Great Powers blocks- Antanta and The Central Powers block, the process of formation of which ended in the first decade of the 20th century, in Europe interstate relations soured even more. Balkans was also influenced from this situation. The ruling circles of Serbia, Greece and Montenegro which shared the same interests for the different parts of Macedonia, Albania and Kosovo, created alliances between them to fight against the common enemy- the Ottoman Empire.

The defeat in the Italian-Turkish war of 1911 and the domestic crises of the Ottoman Empire, were a greater motivation for the Balkan states to expedite preparations for the attack against Turkey. Negotiations for a treaty between Serbia and Bulgaria began since 1889 while in 1912 the treaty of alliance Serbian-Bulgarian was settled, which in its secret compliances predicted the partition of lands which would be occupied.

With this treaty was decided that the lands in north and west of the Šar Mountains (Kosovo Vilayet and Sanjak of Novi Pazar) would take Serbia whereas Bulgaria would take the eastern areas of Rhodope Mountains and Struma river. While provinces of middle Macedonia lying between Šar and Rhodope mountains, the Aegean Sea and Ohrid Lake, if not formed an autonomous province, will then e divided between Serbia and Bulgaria. In late September the Balkan League was complemented with other members: Montenegro and Greece. From which Montenegro started the first war on October 9, 1912, then Serbia on October 17, to continue with Bulgaria and Greece, doing so to begin the first Balkan War.

For Operations on Kosovo, respectively Ferizaj, was appointed The Third Army of Serbian Army under the command of general Božidar Janković. Grouping of forces and supply of ammunition, food and people became in Pristina, when the night of 23/24 October the order from The Army lll of Serbian Army was given to march towards Skopje and Kumanovo. This insight was decided to be in two columns where Ferizaj was named in the column of the right, composed of: Division of Morava Call II and cavalry of the army, which was tasked to conduct permeation in Lipljan-Ferizaj-Kaçanik towards Skopje, on condition that the Army cavalry arrives on Oct.24 to Varosh village near Ferizaj, while Morava Division call I in Ferizaj's region. After a brief fight Lipljan was taken. From there on Oct. 24 the vanguard cavalry left to Ferizaj. Upon entering the city, the Diversion of vanguard occupied the key places such as the post, municipal building, railway station and army barracks.

In the beginning the situation in the city and the surrounding was quiet but soon begins to change, breaks, especially when in Ferizaj came the main part of the Serbian army cavalry. To the city depart Turkish army units with artillery and organized groups of armed Albanians. The eskardon vanguard that was stationed in the northern hill of Ferizaj was attacked. After this attack, the commander of the Morava Division Call II, second regiment commanded by vanguard to accelerate the march toward the city. In the same manner was ordered main part of the Morava Division to accelerate towards the Jerli Prelez village and Sazli village.

Morava Division on Oct. 24 arrived in the eastern part of the village Lloshkobare, where on Oct. 25 the bitter fighting between the Serbian army, Turkish forces and Albanian forces took place. Third Battalion of the middle column occupied the southern edge of the city and released the cavalry surrounded a day earlier in the city.

The resistance of Albanian population 1912–1915

During this time the municipal governing bodies were composed of Mayor, the village leader and officer. Communities of cities formed the Municipal Council. Governing bodies and the court were appointed for one year. The competence of the Municipal Court was the same as in Serbia but conditional that judgements to address the police power.

According to the newspaper Srpske Novine on 17 October 1912 was formed District of Ferizaj as administrative-territorial unit that was part of the district of Pristina. The proposal for such a decision was given by Milorad Ant. Vujiçiqi who was inspector of police, and was implemented by the Supreme Command of Vranje.

According to statistics made by April 4, 1913, District of Ferizaj had 71 villages organized in 10 municipalities. Also were recorded 4897 houses (3141 Albanian, 984 Serbian and 308 Other), 32789 people (16417 women and 16372 men). While according to the leader of the Pristina District no. 3133 Dated. 8.5.1913, the number of residents in Ferizaj was 32802, while only the locality of Ferizaj had 3405 inhabitants. Besides the number of residents in this report has data on religious affiliation, where the number of inhabitants of the Serbian, Orthodox were 8694, Catholic 34, and Islamic faith were: Albanians 23454 and Roma 416.

Throughout 1913 Ferizaj was recognized as the county town under Pristina, and was recognized by the name Ferizaj. By decision of the Ministerial Council of the Kingdom of Serbia on 16 January 1914, entered into force Serbian Law of 16 June 1886 for changing the names of places in Kosovo. According to this decision the name was officially changed from Ferizaj in Uroševac. Also according to this decision Circle of Ferizaj was called Circle of Nerodime, that certainly came from the Nerodime river that runs mainly through this area. According to the 1914 Circle of Nerodime had 10 municipalities, 69 villages, 15 small villages, a town and 32845 inhabitants, where the town of Ferizaj numbered 3405 inhabitants. Now under this law this circle was part of the district of Kosovo.

Noting that railways Ferizaj-Kaçanik-Skopje was a key factor for the economic development of this town, a time has been discontinued and has often been under the control of armed soldiers, we can conclude that caused the interruption of traffic, insecurity and stagnation trade. On October 24, 1912 it is known that the rail-road Skopje-Mitrovica, which had been badly damaged by the Turks, was now adjusted and will soon begin the movement of trains. After General Božidar Jankovićha travelled to the first train released on November 3, the first railway station in Skopje line Ferizaj, the name was changed from Elez Han, as it was known until then, to the General Jankovic.

Ferizaj in 1914, exported wheat, barley and oats. While in Ferizaj also exported corn, beans and leather. Among the crafts developed in Ferizaj 1914 were: shopkeepers, blacksmiths, tailors, hairdressers, butcher, tinsmith, watchmakers, bakers, carpenters, cart workers.

During the years 1912–1915, in Ferizaj there was an entity creditor established by the fund of the church of St. Urosh and took the name Bank of Ferizaj. As a result of heavy taxes Albanian population were extremely impoverished. This led to their displacement in Turkey. Besides Turkey, the population of Ferizaj and of that time migrated to other countries, where only in America had gone about 500-600 people.

During the world wars

First World War
The beginning of the First World War found Kosovo separated between Serbia and Montenegro and because both of them where involved directly from the beginning of the War and the Kosovo area was covered from the fightings. The War started on 28 July 1914 between the two opposing blocs, the bloc of Austro-Hungarian Monarchy with Bulgaria and Serbia with Montenegro bloc.

The Kosovo areas that were already occupied during the Balkan Wars, part of which was Ferizaj were forced to do the collection of animals and food for the needs of the army, as well as the mobilization of the army with new Albanian recruits  In October 1915 Bulgaria entered into the war and it had military developments in the Ferizaj area that was part of the main artery connecting Kumanovo and Skopje with Kosovo. New Corps Command therefore the Serbo-Montenegrin forces during this period were determined in Ferizaj. Ferizaj had served as a stopping point for the penetration from the Kaçanik Gorge for the Bulgarians. But the Serb resistance ended on 25 November 1915 when it was conquered by the Bulgarian Army, which was facilitated by Albanians in hopes that the situation will change and the hard situation will be over. On 1 April 1916 Ferizaj was left Bulgaria as a station key, but the possibility of using the railway was given in use also to the Austro - Hungarian command for the railway line Prizren - Ferizaj - Albania.

One of the first actions that the Bulgarian government had made was the registration of the male residents from age 16 to 60 years who will mobilize the Bulgarian army and will work on building the railway Gostivar - Kicevo, in which worked 63 people from Ferizaj. During this period there was only one Albanian private school that was allowed by the Austro-Hungarian Monarchy, which was in a Catholic church near Ferizaj, and had about 50 pupils and teacher was a Catholic priest. And to open other Albanian schools in this period was not allowed. So this period of Bulgarian occupation that lasted three years, brought very bad occurrences for the residents of Ferizaj, like kills, damage to private property, rape, etc. The difficult situation and poverty brought also starvation to the residents, as recorded by the head of District Ferizaj.

During this period, many settlements were added Bulgarian suffixes - ov, - ev, and -ova. Based on this they named Ferizaj as Ferizovo. In September 1918 the decline was seen in Bulgaria, as well as taking Skopje from French and Serbian army was crucial for Bulgaria's capitulation. The French and Serbian army broke through the gorge of Kaçanik on October 4, 1918 and on October 5, 1918 the town of Ferizaj was put back under the rule of the Kingdom of Serbia.

Interwar period
In late October 1918 the French army and Serbian representatives arrived in the town to establish Serbian control. Serbian government was established on 31 October 1918 and Ferizaj was appointed temporarily under the Deputy Prefect of the Nerodimlje District. In 1920 it was established as an administrative division under this division Nerodimlje had 10 municipalities with 73 villages and 32,845 inhabitants. According to the 1921 census there were 22,401 Albanians (Muslims) and 7,834 Serbs in the District.

The District of Nerodimlje in 1921 was distributed in the following municipalities, with number of inhabitants: Babuš (4,828), Gatnje (2,883), Gotovuša (2,652), Kosin (2,218), Nerodimlje (4,129), Talinovac (1,793), Štimlje (5,269), Štrpce (4.551), Ferizović/Uroševac (3.529). The district of Nerodimlje as such was active until the beginning of World War II.

During this period the Kingdom of Serbia undertook actions to disarm the population, leading to many residents moving to Albania and Turkey. One of the government actions was the "Land Reform" that had quite negative consequences for the Albanians, in the region of Ferizaj this colonizing lasted from 1918 to 1941, but not as intensely as in other areas. Includes areas that were Agrarian Reform in the District of Nerodime were mostly marginal lands, which has been sufficient in the Municipality of Talinofcit, Kosines, Babush, Shtimje and its vicinity town of Ferizaj.

Between the two world wars took place quite trade, all goods mainly cereals coming from most cities of that imported Kosovo in Skopje and Thessaloniki went through Ferizaj and also reciprocally, at this time Ferizaj numbered 117 trade importer.

Before the start of Second World War was formed the first labor organization in Ferizaj, which came as a result of the development of several small industries and factories in Ferizaj. Important role played also the banking institutions, Bank of Ferizaj first fund was established by the Church of Saint Uroshit (1909) in 1919 and that work until the beginning of the Second World War.

In the field of education and culture Ferizaj had great stagnation in this period, according to 1937 evidence the District of Nerodime had 23 schools (elementary, class 1-4), which teachings followed 3,063 students. Standoff in education had especially the Albanians. because the learnings took place only in Serbian language and the Albanian children did not know the Serbian language, so illiteracy amounted to 90%. An important role in the education of the Albanian residents played the Madrasa - Muslim religious school, the data shows that in 1931 there were 51 Albanian pupils who attend this school, the teaching process was in Albanian and the teacher was Hasan Efendi Nahi and this school functioned until the beginning of Second World War.

Second World War
The early period of the Second World War had a positive impact for residents of Ferizaj for not realizing the Convention of 1938, which was signed between Yugoslavia and Turkey for the resettlement of Albanians in Turkey, and that included the massive resettlement of the residents of the District of Nerodime. Under this convention, this migration was to be realized in the period from 1939 until 1944. But the attack led of Italy to Albania that it had not been realized. With the invasion of Albanian territory by Italian and German forces, Italian troops were deployed in Ferizaj because it was found an auxiliary army airport of the Kingdom of Serbia, which served the Italian military aircraft.

In comparison with other territories that were occupied by the Germans and Bulgarians, the territories that were occupied by Italians the economic situation of residents was more favorable, because Italians also encouraged further development of trade. This economic development led many trade from Gjakova, Prizren, Peć and from other areas to take place in Ferizaj, as it was developed and a key point for trade in this period.

In early 1941, the Communist Party's leading bodies of Ferizaj were committed that the more residents to join the National Liberation Movement, the end of this year in Ferizaj were already established groups of illegal armed before. With the capitulation of Italy, the country was occupied by Germany, where the behavior of the German occupation was favorable in comparison with the Italians against the Albanian population. Even after the German invasion the National Liberation Movement was strengthened even further to 1943 when the arrest and deportation of all participants began. This movement resulted in the liberation of the country and eventually came to the liberation of the city on December 2, 1944. After the liberation of the city before the National Liberation Movement stood two tasks: release and protect throughout the territory and rebuild the economy of the country.

The second half of the 20th century
On November 17, 1944 Ferizaj was liberated, characteristics of the social-economic relations and political situation of that time were: the city had 4000 inhabitants 2/3 of these were Albanian, who dealt mainly with trade, craft and agriculture and despite of this production was low.

National Liberation Council from illegal became legal with liberation of the city, with 17 members, with Isa Sadriu as mayor and secretary Shuqe Avdijeviq on top. The National Council of the liberation of the district held on 11.12.1944 at meeting to the people was declared legal by 32 members and 7 stations. It was led by Hivzi Sylejman on top of the board while Valkovic Spira was secretary. At the same time military units were formed: The Command of country 18.11.1944 and immediately the command of the regions military which included National Liberation Council in Nerodime districts, the Kaçanik, Vitina, Gjilan and Kamenica.

During the 1945 The Federal temporary assembly issued a law on agrarian reform and colonization, and in the second half of this year was implemented agrarian reform, was confiscated all land owners who did not deal with agriculture, was established the fund of land, where a part of them were handed to landless peasants, a part was returned to previous owners and the surplus joined the social agricultural sector formed at the time. Such a land of this nature turned to the Ferizaj municipality too.

The period of reconstruction
After the liberation of this region began immediately reconstruction of war-damaged economy. After the city bombing on 7 April 1941 except material damages were also victims, on the occasion of withdrawal by 16 November 1944 the enemy destroyed all communication lines connecting Ferizaj with other cities, as well as the building of the railway station, many tunnels and bridges in Ferizaj-Skopje road.

Road and rail traffic was rebuilt in the next three months with volunteer work brigades and population, that was of particular significance for the circulation of passengers and wares. Also work brigades were formed, battalions and specialized groups to craft workers that worked not only with important facilities but also those with federal importance. Most of the youth were able of living by learning various crafts and professions.

Construction period
In the city of Ferizaj were also built industrial buildings. Along with their construction was formed the working class composed on the few number of mainly of craft workers. Also in this period were voluntarily built homes of cooperatives as centers in which except agricultural works were developed cultural, entertainment, and politics.

Positive results are shown in eradicating illiteracy and expansion of the primary schools in which for the first time was developed education in Albanian. Thus began to develop intensively entertaining and cultural life, the commitment of the party and popular government for the emancipation of Albanian nationality women, from attempted to be equal members of the socialist community. The construction and reconstruction of the country and fight for the realization of the five-year plan were followed by more material difficulties, political and economic pressures, from Eastern countries.

Society and self-governance of workers
In 1951 begin the self-governance of workers. During the years 1950–1951 were formed first workers councils of oil factory, combine wood, in enterprise of brick and tile, in commercial enterprise "November 17" and in the agricultural cooperative, where with their establishment was added interest of working class to the manufacturing.

In 1953, constitutional law sanctioned situation and principles of self-government and created process of instituting social sphere, with this case were formed social government bodies in economic school, in all primary schools, health facilities, administration, bodies of jurisprudence, was given a special place to the worker class.

In the Municipality of Ferizaj also for the first time in the election were elected members of the municipal chamber. In 1960–1966 years joined most of Štimlje and municipality of Štrpce to the territory of this municipality. Constitutional elections not only enabled the implementation of decentralization of power from the federation to the municipality, but the working class was possible to decide on expanded reproduction.

Kosovo War (1998–99)

 
In 1999, during the war, the city of Ferizaj suffered extensive damage by the Serbian army that shelled and burned Albanian-populated neighborhoods. In March 1999 a large number of children were poisoned in schools, including some university students; around 7000–9000 were poisoned, some being residents of Ferizaj. After the war, the city of Ferizaj has had serious inter-ethnic trouble which has resulted in almost all of the rest of the Serbs and non-Albanian residents leave the city.

Camp Bondsteel played an important role in the economy of the city of Ferizaj. The camp was established immediately after the war. The camp is quite large: 955 acres or 360,000 square meters. Bondsteel is located on rolling hills and farmland near the city of Ferizaj.

References

History of Ferizaj
History of Kosovo